Crypt Peak is an  mountain summit located in Glacier National Park, in Glacier County of the U.S. state of Montana. It is situated along the Canada–United States border, above Crypt Lake, and is partially within Waterton Lakes National Park. Crypt Peak is part of the Lewis Range, and is approximately three miles east of Waterton Lake. Precipitation runoff from the mountain drains west to Waterton Lake, and east to Belly River. This geographical feature's name has not yet been officially adopted by the United States Board on Geographic Names.

Climate
Based on the Köppen climate classification, Crypt Peak is located in an alpine subarctic climate zone characterized by long, usually very cold winters, and short, cool to mild summers. Temperatures can drop below −10 °F with wind chill factors below −30 °F.

Geology
Like the mountains in Glacier National Park, Crypt Peak is composed of sedimentary rock laid down during the Precambrian to Jurassic periods. The reddish rock at the top of Crypt Peak is argillite.

See also

 List of mountains and mountain ranges of Glacier National Park (U.S.)
 Geology of the Rocky Mountains

References

External links
 National Park Service web site: Glacier National Park
 Parks Canada web site: Waterton Lakes National Park
 Crypt Peak photo: Flickr

Lewis Range
Mountains of Glacier County, Montana
Mountains of Glacier National Park (U.S.)
Mountains of Montana
North American 2000 m summits